W-VHS is a high-definition analog videotape format.

 WVHS as a four letter acronym may also stand for a number of different high schools:
Walker Valley High School in Tennessee
Warwick Valley High School in Warwick, New York
Waubonsie Valley High School in Aurora, Illinois
West Valley High School in Fairbanks, Alaska
 West Valley High School in Cottonwood, California
West Valley High School in Hemet, California
West Valley High School in Yakima, Washington
Wilsonville High School in Wilsonville, Oregon
Wyalusing Valley Junior-Senior High School in Wyalusing, Pennsylvania
Westview High School (San Diego) in San Diego, California